Esse may refer to:

Places
 Essé, a commune in the Ille-et-Vilaine department, Brittany, northwestern France
 Esse, Charente, a commune in the Charente department, Nouvelle-Aquitaine, southwestern France
 Esse, Cameroon, a town and commune in Cameroon
 Esse, Finland, a former municipality of Finland, now a village of Pedersöre
 Esse (Diemel), a river of Hesse, Germany, tributary of the Diemel
 ESSE Purse Museum, a handbag museum in Little Rock, Arkansas
 Halsbrücker Esse, a smokestack near Freiberg

Organizations
 Daihatsu Esse, a Japanese car
 Esse (cigarette), a South Korean brand of cigarettes
 Esse stoves, ESSE is a United Kingdom brand of heating appliances
 EsseGesse, an Italian team of cartoonists
 European Society for the Study of English, an organization for university teachers and researchers in English Studies

People
 Tetha, also known as S. Esse, a 5th-century virgin and saint in Wales and Cornwall
 Herb Esse (1920–2000), Australian rules footballer
 Parker Esse, American choreographer
 Esse Akida (born 1992), Kenyan footballer
 Esse Baharmast,  football referee
 Romain Esse (born 2005), English footballer

Other uses

 esse arts + opinions, a contemporary art magazine
 Esse 850, a racing sportboat
 Esse 990, a racing sportboat
 the Latin term meaning "to be", see being
 Esse quam videri, a Latin phrase meaning "To be, rather than to seem"
 De bene esse, a Latin phrase meaning "well being"
 In esse, a Latin phrase meaning "in existence"